SADT or Structured Analysis and Design Technique is a software engineering methodology for describing systems as a hierarchy of functions.

SADT may also refer to:
Self Accelerating Decomposition Temperature, a physical property of organic peroxides